Vladimir Vasilyevich Zaytsev (Russian: Владимир Васильевич Зайцев; born in 1951), is a Russian politician who had been the acting head of Lipetsk Oblast from 1992 to 1993.

Biography

Vladimir Zaystev was born in Kireyevsky District of Tula Oblast in 1951. He graduated from the Tula Polytechnic Institute with a degree in mining engineer-economist.

In 1992, he had been the Deputy Head of Administration of the Lipetsk Oblast, as the Chairman of the Committee on Finance and Economic Forecasting. On 23 December 1992, Zaytsev became the acting head of Lipetsk Oblast, until being replaced by Mikhail Narolin on 11 April 1993.

References

1951 births
Living people
Heads of Lipetsk Oblast
People from Kireyevsky District
Russian politicians